The Municipality of Ohrid is a municipality in the southwestern part of North Macedonia. Ohrid is also the name of the city where the municipal seat is found. Ohrid Municipality is in the Southwestern Statistical Region.

Geography
Ohrid Municipality borders
 Debarca Municipality to the west and north,
 Resen Municipality to the east, and
 Demir Hisar Municipality to the northeast.

Demographics
According to the national census of 2002, the municipality of Ohrid, before the attachment of Kosel Municipality, had 54,380 inhabitants; according to the census of 1994, it had 52,732.
The former Kosel Municipality had a population of 1,369 in 2002 and 1,759 in 1994.
The present-day combined municipality has  51,428 residents.

Inhabited places
The municipality has 29 inhabited places, one town and 28 villages.

Coat of arms
The coat of arms of Ohrid (Macedonian: Грб на Охрид) is the coat of arms of the Ohrid Municipality, it depicts Lake Ohrid, Tsar Samuel's Fortress, and a sailboat, the sailboat symbolizing tourism. The coat of arms is designed using the Macedonian territorial heraldic system featuring a mural crown of its status and a wreath of Macedonian oak.

The blazon is Azure, on a mount Vert a wall gated between two towers all Argent. In base a barry wavy of the first. Other elements include the shield is crowned with a Mural crown of three towers Or, central tower gated, adorned with rubies and pearls, wreathed with two oak branches Vert fructed Or joined with ribbon Gules.

References

External links
 Official website
 Official website for Info, Places to visit and reservations in Ohrid

 
Southwestern Statistical Region
Municipalities of North Macedonia